This page is a discography for American musician Little Richard (1932–2020). Described as "the architect of rock and roll", Little Richard was a pioneering singer-songwriter whose career also encompassed rhythm and blues, soul, and gospel. He began his recording career in 1951, signing to RCA Victor, releasing his first singles, and his first album in 1957, although he released his last album in 1992, he continued to tour into the 21st century. He attained international success after signing with Specialty Records in 1955.

Recording sessions

The pre-Specialty sessions
RCA Victor sessions: WGST Studio, Atlanta, October 16, 1951, and January 12, 1952

Peacock sessions: Houston, February 25 and October 5, 1953

The Specialty sessions
Little Richard recorded the demonstration tape for Specialty at WBML Studio, Macon, on February 9, 1955.

He was recording for Specialty for two years, from September 13, 1955, to October 18, 1957.

The recording sessions Little Richard cut for Specialty are among the most important in the history of pop music.

When Richard abdicated from Rock 'n' Roll in late 1957, Specialty was forced to go back to earlier, less rock-oriented recordings they had rejected initially to make future releases. In an effort to make these bluesy recordings sound "current", they added a female chorus (and in at least one instance, extra instrumentation) to the basic track.

The Goldner sessions
Several religious cuts were recorded in the summer of 1959 in New York City and released by different labels owned by (or associated with) record industry mogul George Goldner (End, Goldisc, Coral, Spin O Rama, etc.). The recordings are considered miserable, and three record labels with access to the "dirgelike" cuts overdubbed drums and other percussion to fill out the sound. However, the best of these recordings exude a purity and commitment not always found on Richard's later recordings.

The Little Star sessions
Little Richard recorded six rhythm and blues songs, 3 Fats Domino vocals and 3 instrumentals, backed by his 1950s band, the Upsetters, on November 24, 1962, in New York. Two singles were released by Little Star under the name "The World Famous Upsetters".

The Mercury sessions
Little Richard was working for Mercury from June 1961 to March 1962. These excellent recordings have been produced by Quincy Jones and Bumps Blackwell.
It appears a second Mercury album was planned but shelved. Richard reached the charts with two single releases.

The Atlantic sessions
The recordings made for Atlantic from June 14, 1962, to April 2, 1963, continue Richard's commitment to religious material. "Crying in the Chapel" was a regional USA hit .

The return to Specialty
In the wake of the "British Invasion" and following a successful tour of England, Richard collected his current guitarist (Glen Willings), the drummer from his New Orleans sessions (Earl Palmer), and old labelmates Don and Dewey and returned to Specialty to start his comeback.

He recorded five titles (including "Well Alright" and "Bama Lama Bama Loo") in two sessions in March and April 1964.  A single was released at the time; and four of the songs were eventually released, with additional overdubs, on the 1970 compilation Well Alright!.

The Vee Jay sessions
Charles White wrote in 1984: "Even with access to the Vee Jay files, information is a bit uncertain in some areas... Of most importance to latter-day rock fans are the cuts that Jimi Hendrix played on, as a member of Richard's touring band. We have singled out those tracks we are relatively sure have Hendrix involvement, although he may have appeared on others."

Little Richard was recording for Vee Jay from June 1964 to at least May–June 1965. (Vee Jay Executive Betty Chiapetta reported in 1982, that Richard recorded several instrumentals for the label). According to Charles White, Jimi Hendrix was playing guitar at least on the first session including such titles as "Whole Lotta Shakin' Goin' On", "Hound Dog", "Lawdy Miss Clawdy", "Money Honey", "Goodnight Irene" and others, released on the album Little Richard Is Back. Hendrix played on at least 9 cuts on the second LR Vee Jay album, of '50s remakes. Critics have lauded the Richard-Hendrix songs "I Don't Know What You've Got (But It's Got Me)", a Soul hit in late 1965, and "Dancing All Around The World" (aka "Dance A Go Go") and "You'd Better Stop", recorded in New York City May or June, '65; the latter two breaking through many years later on various compilations.

The Modern sessions
Little Richard was recording for the Modern Records label from December 1965 to January 1966.

The Modern recordings are demos, studio warm-ups, tapes supplied by Richard, and actual Modern sessions. Two albums were issued, all tracks of the first one The Incredible Little Richard Sings His Greatest Hits - Live! have an overdubbed audience to enhance a live show(s) done at 'The Domino', a club in Atlanta, Georgia, December 1, 1965.

There are at least six  tracks still unreleased (including “Try Me”, "I Got a Woman", "Good-Bye So Long" [aka "Goodbye Baby"], "Satisfaction", "Baby Face", "High Heel Sneakers"). Two songs are leftovers from Vee Jay Records, an extended version of "Groovy Little Suzy" and a studio version of "Slippin' and Slidin'", both from August 1964. It appears that a third, "Do The Jerk" [aka "Get Down With It"], was recorded in November 1964 in Nashville with Jimi Hendrix. One studio single charted.

The Okeh sessions
Contemporary, yet progressive mix of pop, jazz, and soul studio cuts and a charting, in-studio-with-audience live set highlight Richard's Okeh period from February 5, 1966, to May 17, 1967 at Hollywood and (in December 1966) at Abbey Road Studios.  Penniman's long-time friend, musician Larry Williams produced the pair of albums. Two singles charted.

The Brunswick sessions
Richard recorded for Brunswick six titles in 1967–68. Three singles have been released. It appears a live album, "Little Richard Sings At The Aladdin" was planned. It is not found in the Brunswick files.

The Reprise sessions
The Reprise era was the peak of Richard's comeback, highlighted by numerous television talk-show appearances. The sessions took place from March 11, 1970, to April 1972. (Reprise files mention a 1969 session in Los Angeles, for Blackwell Productions; no titles available).
Sessions yielded two hit singles and one hit album. Some tracks from April 1971, first appeared under alternate titles, for the Ala label.

Miscellaneous sessions
Little Richard recorded three titles for the film Let the Good Times Roll circa late 1972, for United Records in January 1973, and for other labels in 1973–75. He re-recorded his mid-50s and mid-60s Specialty hits for K-tel in 1976. In 1979, Koala Records issued what sounds like an early 1970s performance. In 1979, he recorded the gospel album God's Beautiful City, issued by Word Records. In 1985 and 1986, he recorded the album Lifetime Friend, issued by Warner Bros. in 1986.

Studio albums

Live albums

Compilation albums
1958 Little Richard (with Buck Ram and his Rock 'n Ram Orchestra)
1960: Little Richard Sings: Clap Your Hands (Spinorama M119)
1963: Sings Spirituals
1963: His Biggest Hits (Specialty SP-2111)
1964: Sings the Gospel
1968: The Wild and Frantic Little Richard
1967: Rock N Roll Forever
1968: Little Richard's Grooviest 17 Original Hits (Specialty)
1968: Forever Yours (Roulette)
1969: Good Golly Miss Molly
1969: Little Richard
1970: Every Hour with Little Richard
1970: Rock Hard Rock Heavy
1970: Little Richard
1970: Well Alright!
1971: Mr. Big
1972: The Original
1972: Friends from the Beginning – Little Richard and Jimi Hendrix
1972: Super Hits (Trip; gatefold)
1973: Rip It Up
1974: Recorded Live
1974: Talkin' 'bout Soul
1975: Keep a Knockin'''
1976: Sings1977: Now1977: 22 Original Hits (Warwick)
1983: 20 Greatest Hits (Lotus)
1984: Little Richard's Greatest (Kent)
1985: 18 Greatest Hits (Rhino)
1985: The Essential Little Richard (Specialty)
1988: Lucille1991: The Georgia Peach1996: Shag on Down by the Union Hall Featuring Shea Sandlin & Richard "The Sex" Hounsome1996: Little Richard's Grand Slam Hits (DIMI Music Group)
2006: Here Comes Little Richard/Little Richard2008: The Very Best of Little Richard2016:  California (I'm Comin')Label overviews
1989: The Specialty Sessions (Ace, UK, 6CD; truncated 3CD version released in US on Specialty)
1996: The Second Coming (Charly; also released as Dancin' All Around the World - The Complete Vee-Jay Recordings; all previously released, missing alternate take of "I Don't Know What You've Got", and other unreleased material)
2004: Get Down With It: The Complete Okeh Sessions (all studio; Columbia)
2005: King Of Rock and Roll: The Complete Reprise Sessions (Rhino Handmade)
2005: Get Rich Quick – Birth of a Legend, 1951–1954 (RCA Victor, Peacock, Republic; Rev-Ola)
2015: Directly from My Heart: The Best of the Specialty & Vee-Jay Years'' (Concord Music Group)

Singles

Billboard Year-End performances

Guest appearances/Duets

References

External links
 

Discographies of American artists
Rock music discographies
Rhythm and blues discographies
Pop music discographies